Bobby Reid may refer to:

Bobby Reid (footballer, born 1911) (1911–1987), Scottish international winger
Bobby Reid (footballer, born 1936) (1936–2000), Scottish professional goalkeeper
Bobby Reid (footballer, born 1955), Scottish professional defender
Bobby Reid (American football) (born 1985), American football quarterback
Bobby Decordova-Reid (born 1993), English professional footballer, previously known as Bobby Reid

See also
Robert Reid (disambiguation)